Jan Edvard Carlsson (12 March 1937 – 31 August 2017), known professionally as Janne 'Loffe' Carlsson, was a Swedish actor, musician, composer and artist.

Biography 

Carlsson was born in Stockholm, to Erik Carlsson (1893–1953) and Tyra Törnkvist (1901–1981). His older brother, Leopold Fare (1926–1996), was an artist. Carlsson has one daughter.

Carlsson's debut as an actor came in 1950. He is perhaps most famous for his roles in the comedies Repmånad (1979) and Göta kanal eller Vem drog ur proppen? (1981). Carlsson is also well known for playing lead roles in several film adaptations of the Swedish writer Stig Claesson's books, such as Vem älskar Yngve Frej (1973), På palmblad och rosor (1976) and Henrietta (1983).

Carlsson was also a skilled drummer and featured on several albums of the 1960s, 1970s and 1980s, notably for fellow Swede, Doris, on the album Did you give the world some love today Baby. He was the 'Karlsson' of the Swedish jazz fusion/psychedelic rock duo Hansson & Karlsson that were active in the late 1960s, and performed together with musicians such as Dexter Gordon, Johnny Griffin and Jimi Hendrix.

Carlsson died of liver cancer on 31 August 2017 at the age of 80.

Filmography

Film

Television

Notes

External links 

1937 births
2017 deaths
20th-century Swedish male actors
21st-century Swedish male actors
Musicians from Stockholm

Swedish male film actors
Swedish male television actors
Swedish drummers
Male drummers
Male actors from Stockholm
Swedish jazz drummers
Deaths from liver cancer
Deaths from cancer in Sweden
Male jazz musicians